Matvey Vyacheslavovich Mamykin (born 31 October 1994) is a Russian cyclist, who most recently rode for UCI Continental team . Born in Moscow, Mamykin was named in the startlist for the 2016 Vuelta a España and the start list for the 2017 Giro d'Italia.

Major results

2015
 1st Stage 3 Giro della Valle d'Aosta
 3rd Overall Tour de l'Avenir
1st  Mountains classification
1st Stage 7
 5th Grand Prix of Sochi Mayor
 7th Grand Prix Sarajevo
 9th Overall Course de la Paix U23
 10th Road race, National Under-23 Road Championships
2016
 8th Overall Vuelta a Burgos
1st  Young rider classification
 9th Time trial, National Road Championships

Grand Tour general classification results timeline

References

External links

 
 

1994 births
Living people
Cyclists from Moscow
Russian male cyclists